STATSCORE is a Polish sports data company with headquarters in Katowice, Poland. STATSCORE provides sports statistics, data and live match information to sports organizations, leagues, media outlets, broadcasters and betting operators.

The company was founded as softnetSPORT in January 2006 in Katowice by Tomasz Myalski. STATSCORE's products include sports widgets, live trackers, sports data visualizations, minisites, and data feeds.

STATSCORE's data currently covers 29 sports and over 10,000 sports competitions from all over the world, including soccer, American football, basketball, baseball, volleyball, rugby, ice hockey, tennis, futsal and ski jumping. The company also provides data for e-sports, such as League of Legends, Counter Strike, Dota 2. STATSCORE employs teams of professional scouts responsible for collecting live data from sporting events held around the world.

Partners and clients 
STATSCORE is a data provider to numerous sports leagues and federations, including Polish Fortuna 1 Liga, Polish Futsal Ekstraklasa, PGNiG Superliga (both men and women competitions), Polska Hokej Liga  (Polish Hockey League), and Slovak Slovnaft Handball Extraliga., as well as professional sports clubs, such as Sporting Clube de Portugal. STATSCORE's data has been widely used by sports betting companies, such as EveryMatrix, BtoBet, Altenar, STS, and tipp3. Sports statistics collected by the company have also been employed by media outlets, including Le Figaro and Onet.pl.

In 2020 STATSCORE became the naming rights sponsor of the Polish Futsal Ekstraklasa.

Awards 
In 2016, STATSCORE won the Deloitte Rising Stars Award. In 2017 and 2020, the company was shortlisted in two categories at the SBC Awards. In 2018, STATSCORE was recognised as one of the 50 fastest-growing technology companies in Central Europe (Technology Fast 50 CE).

References

Sports databases
Providers of services to on-line companies
Online companies of Poland